Macronycteris is a genus of bats belonging to the family Hipposideridae.

The species of this genus are found in Africa.

Species:

Macronycteris commersoni 
Macronycteris cryptovalorona
Macronycteris gigas 
Macronycteris thomensis 
Macronycteris vittatus

References

Hipposideridae
Bat genera